Jeffrey Holland (born September 27, 1997) is an American football outside linebacker who is a free agent. He played college football at Auburn. He was signed by the Denver Broncos as an undrafted free agent in 2018.

Early years
Holland attended Trinity Christian Academy in Jacksonville, Florida. He committed to Auburn University to play college football.

College career
Holland played at Auburn from 2015 to 2017. As a junior in 2017, he was named an All-American by Sports Illustrated after recording 45 tackles and 10 sacks. After the season, he decided to forgo his senior year and enter the 2018 NFL Draft.

Professional career

Denver Broncos
Holland signed with the Denver Broncos as an undrafted free agent on May 1, 2018. He was waived on September 1, 2018, and was re-signed to the practice squad. He was promoted to the active roster on November 29, 2018.

On August 11, 2019, Holland was waived by the Broncos.

Arizona Cardinals
On August 12, 2019, Holland was claimed off waivers by the Arizona Cardinals. He was waived on August 25, 2019.

Buffalo Bills
On August 26, 2019, Holland was claimed off waivers by the Buffalo Bills. He was waived on August 31, 2019.

Los Angeles Chargers
On October 1, 2019, Holland was signed to the Los Angeles Chargers practice squad. He was released on December 3, 2019.

Los Angeles Rams
On December 11, 2019, Holland was signed to the Los Angeles Rams practice squad. He signed a reserve/future contract with the Rams on December 31, 2019. He was waived on April 27, 2020.

Holland had a tryout with the Las Vegas Raiders on August 23, 2020.

Atlanta Falcons
On June 10, 2021, Holland signed with the Atlanta Falcons. He was waived on June 17.

References

External links
Auburn Tigers bio
twitter

1997 births
Living people
Players of American football from Jacksonville, Florida
American football linebackers
American football defensive ends
Auburn Tigers football players
Atlanta Falcons players
Arizona Cardinals players
Buffalo Bills players
Denver Broncos players
Los Angeles Chargers players
Los Angeles Rams players